Stade de Reims won Division 1 season 1961/1962 of the French Association Football League with 48 points.

Participating teams

 Angers SCO
 Le Havre AC
 RC Lens
 Olympique Lyonnais
 FC Metz
 AS Monaco
 SO Montpellier
 FC Nancy
 OGC Nice
 Nîmes Olympique
 RC Paris
 Stade de Reims
 Stade Rennais UC
 FC Rouen
 AS Saint-Etienne
 UA Sedan-Torcy
 FC Sochaux-Montbéliard
 Stade Français FC
 RC Strasbourg
 Toulouse FC

Final table

Promoted from Division 2, who will play in Division 1 season 1962/1963
 FC Grenoble:Champion of Division 2
 US Valenciennes-Anzin:runner-up of Division 2
 Bordeaux: Third place
 Olympique de Marseille: Fourth place, Inter-Cities Fairs Cup

Results

Top goalscorers

References
 Division 1 season 1961-1962 at pari-et-gagne.com

Ligue 1 seasons
French
1